William Barclay (1546–1608) was a Scottish jurist.

Life

He was born in Aberdeenshire in 1546. Educated at the University of Aberdeen, he went to France by 1572, and studied law at the University of Bourges, where he took his doctor's degree. Charles III, Duke of Lorraine, appointed him professor of civil law in the newly founded university of Pont-à-Mousson, and also made him Counsellor of State and master of requests. Here, he was colleague to the French jurist Pierre Grégoire, with whom he entered into a dispute with the Jesuit faction in the university. In 1603 he was obliged to leave France, having incurred the enmity of the Jesuits, through his opposition to their proposal to admit his son John a member of their society.

Arriving in England, he was offered considerable preferment by James VI on condition of becoming a member of the Church of England. This offer he refused, and he returned to France in 1604, when he was appointed professor of civil law in the university of Angers. He died at Angers in 1608.

Works

His principal work was De Regno et Regali Potestate (1600), a strenuous defence of the rights of kings, in which he refutes the doctrines of those he terms monarchomachs: George Buchanan, "Junius Brutus" (Hubert Languet or Philippe de Mornay) and Jean Boucher, a leading member of the French Catholic League; he also wrote De potestate papae: an & quatenus in reges & principes seculares jus & imperium habeat (published in 1609, after his death), in opposition to the usurpation of temporal powers by the pope, which called forth the celebrated reply of Cardinal Bellarmine; also commentaries on some of the titles of the Pandects.

References
 
"William Barclay, Professor of Law at Pont-a-Mousson and Angers" by Andrew F Stewart in Stair Society Miscellany V, ed H L MacQueen, Edinburgh 2006 
Andrew Pyle (editor), Dictionary of Seventeenth Century British Philosophers (2000), article pp. 59–62.

Further reading
 
 
 Ernest Dubois, Guillaume Barclay jurisconsulte écossais, professeur à Pont-à-Mousson et à Angers, 1546-1608 (Nancy/Paris, 1872)
 Claude Collot, L'école doctrinale de droit public de Pont-à-Mousson (Pierre Grégoire et Guillaume Barclay) fin du XVIe siècle (1965)
 David Baird Smith, 'William Barclay', Scottish Historical Review, 11 (1913–14): 136–63.  
 S. Nicholls, 'Catholic resistance theory: William Barclay versus Jean Boucher', History of European Ideas, 44, 4 (2018): 404–418.

1546 births
1608 deaths
Scottish lawyers
Scottish legal professionals
People from Aberdeenshire
Scottish scholars and academics
University of Bourges
Alumni of the University of Aberdeen
Academic staff of the University of Angers (pre-1793)
Scottish Roman Catholic writers